Seal Cove is a town in the Canadian province of Newfoundland and Labrador, located on Fortune Bay. The town had a population of 100 in the 2021 Census. The population of Seal Cove, Fortune Bay has fallen to approximately 100 largely due to outmigration for education and other work-related pursuits. The town was incorporated in 1972.

Historically, residents earned a living by fishing and logging for the large pulp and paper companies located in Central and Western parts of the province. In recent years there has been a greater dependency on work in the construction industry.

Demographics 

See also
 List of cities and towns in Newfoundland and Labrador
 Newfoundland outport

References 

Towns in Newfoundland and Labrador